Festus Ehimare known professionally as Emperor Geezy, is a Nigerian music executive, producer, and promoter. He is the founder and the CEO of G-Worldwide Entertainment, and has helped launch the careers of many famous artists including Iceberg Slim, Kizz Daniel, Sugarboy, and DJ Shabsy. He was the executive producer of New Era, and Believe studio album, and the movie Suga Suga.

Early life
Festus Ehimare was born on May 15, 1987, in Ajegunle-Lagos, Nigeria. He grew up in a polygamous home, with twelve siblings and he is the eighth child of Patrick Ehimare, who was a civil engineer, and a retired foreman, for Nigerian Ports Authority, and Elizabeth Ehimare, who was a trader. Festus hails from Edo State, and he’s a descendant of the Esan people. He had his secondary education at Cardoso High School, in  Badia Ijora, and graduated with a B.Sc in Entrepreneurship and Business Management from National Open University of Nigeria.

Career
In 2007, he founded G-Worldwide Entertainment, and rose to prominence in 2014 following the signing of Kiss Daniel (now. Kizz Daniel), Sugarboy, and DJ Shabsy to his imprint G-Worldwide Entertainment. On 12 June 2015, he was nominated in the Record Executive of the Year category at the 2015 NEA Awards. On 11 July 2017, he was nominated for the Entertainment Executive of the Year at the 2017 NEA Awards. He executively produced Kiss Daniel studio album New Era and Sugarboy studio album Believe.

On 3 January 2018, he was shortlisted on the YNaija Power List of 2017, for his contribution in the entertainment. Ehimare is known for launching the music career of Kiss Daniel, Sugarboy, Ajura, and Easy Jay, through his entertainment company G-Worldwide. He has released numerous hit singles under G-Worldwide Entertainment including: "Too Much Money", "Ayanfe", "Woju", "Laye", "Mama", "Raba", "Sofa", "Yeba", "Good Time (Remix)", and "Hola Hola", from Kizz Daniel, Iceberg Slim, Sugarboy, and DJ Shabsy.

G-Worldwide

In 2007, Emperor Geezy founded G-Worldwide Entertainment and began promoting musical talents in 2011.

In 2013, the music company rebranded and began operating as a record label, with the signing of its first act Kizz Daniel.

In November 2017, Geezy had a disagreement with Kizz Daniel, shortly after his departure from the label, and sued him. On 15 June 2018, Geezy filed a new case to claim the trademarks "Kiss Daniel or Kizz Daniel", under G-Worldwide and was approved by the High Court of Lagos State. On 12 March 2018, Soundcity TV, released a statement "A source has hinted that Kiss Daniel through his lawyers has reached out to his former label with a hope to reach a settlement". On 8 April 2022, Geezy and Daniel settled their disputes, outside the court in a viral video tagged #Peace&Love, where Daniel and Geezy were both seen dancing to Daniel's song "Oshe", shared on Kizz Daniel's Instagram.

Awards and nominations

References

External links
 

1987 births
Living people
Nigerian music industry executives
National Open University of Nigeria alumni
21st-century Nigerian businesspeople
People from Benin City
Nigerian film producers
Music promoters
Music industry executives